Five Forks is an unincorporated community in Ritchie County, West Virginia, United States.

References 

Unincorporated communities in West Virginia
Unincorporated communities in Ritchie County, West Virginia